Kim Sin-cheol (born 29 November 1990) is a South Korean footballer who plays as midfielder for FC Anyang in K League 2. He is a son of Kim Bong-gil. Besides South Korea, he has played in Portugal.

Career
Yoo was selected by Bucheon FC in the 2013 K League draft. He made 25 appearances and 2 goals in his debut season. In 2014~2015 seasons, he served in army by Ansan Mugunghwa FC.  After 2016 season, he moves to FC Anyang.

References

External links

1990 births
Living people
Association football forwards
South Korean footballers
Bucheon FC 1995 players
Ansan Mugunghwa FC players
K League 2 players
Yonsei University alumni
FC Anyang players